Brax is the name of the following communes in France:

 Brax, Haute-Garonne, in the Haute-Garonne department
 Château de Brax, castle in the commune of Brax, France 
 Brax, Lot-et-Garonne, in the Lot-et-Garonne department

Brax may also refer to
Brax (game) a fairly simple abstract strategy board game.
Darryl "Brax" Braxton a fictional character from the soap opera Home and Away.
Tuija Brax (born 1965), Finnish politician and minister

See also
Braxton (disambiguation)